Chauncey, previously known as Buena Vista and Imperial Mills is an unincorporated, mostly historical settlement in Kent County in the U.S. state of Michigan.

It is situated near the south end of Chauncey Road where Bear Creek enters the Grand River. The community of Buena Vista was platted, but the plat was never recorded. The Buena Vista Mill was built in 1848 by Abner and John Brewer. The place, also known as Imperial Mills, was destroyed by fire in 1875 and rebuilt in September 1881 by Denis Porter.

The settlement presumably takes its name from the river bluff, Buena Vista Hill, rising just to its east, the summit of which affords extensive views of the westward bend of the Grand Valley, Kuttshill, and the many Plainfield Hills.

Notes and references

 
 
 

Unincorporated communities in Kent County, Michigan
Populated places established in 1848
Unincorporated communities in Michigan